Sergio Paganella (August 1, 1911 – June 2, 1992) was an Italian basketball player who competed in the 1936 Summer Olympics.

He was born in Mantua (Lombardy) and died in Milan.

Paganella was part of the Italian basketball team, which finished seventh in the Olympic tournament. He played four matches.

External links
part 7 the basketball tournament

1911 births
1992 deaths
Italian men's basketball players
Olympic basketball players of Italy
Basketball players at the 1936 Summer Olympics